Caulobacteraceae is a family of Pseudomonadota within the alpha subgroup. Like all Pseudomonadota, the Caulobacteraceae are gram-negative. Caulobacteraceae includes the genera Asticcacaulis, Brevundimonas, Phenylobacterium and Caulobacter.

The typespecies Caulobacter gives its name also to the recently proposed subclass, the Caulobacteridae, which includes the orders Caulobacterales, Parvularculales, Hyphomicrobiales, Rhodobacterales, Rhodospirillales, Sneathiellales, Sphingomonadales, Kiloniellales, Kordiimonadales and controversially the Holosporales.

References

Caulobacterales